Henry Davies may refer to:

Henry Davies (journalist) (1804–1890), British journalist and publisher
Henry E. Davies (judge) (1805–1881), Chief Judge of the New York Court of Appeals, 1866–1867
Sir Henry Davies (1824–1902), British colonial official, Lieutenant Governor of the Punjab
Henry Eugene Davies (1836–1894), American soldier, writer and lawyer
Henry Davies (Hampshire cricketer) (1865–1934), British cricketer
Henry Davies (Oxford University cricketer) (born 1970), English cricketer
Henry Rodolph Davies (1865–1950), British Army general
Henry Lowrie Davies (1898–1975), British Army general
Sir Henry Walford Davies (1869–1941), British composer
Henry Thomas Davies (1914–2002), British lifeboatman
Henry Davies (Baptist minister) (1753–1825), Welsh Baptist minister
Henry Davies (rugby league), English rugby league player

See also
Harry Davies (disambiguation)
Henry Davis (disambiguation)